A fecal plug (occasionally known as a tappen) is a large mass of hardened feces produced by a bear during its winter hibernation. The plug forms in the colon, and consists of a variety of materials ingested by the bear during and immediately before hibernating.

Some of the fecal plug's material is composed of undigested food that was eaten before the bear even entered its den. However, much is formed by cells that slough off the intestinal walls, rocks ingested by the bear during grooming sessions, and even bits of plant-based bedding. Bears have been observed licking and chewing on their own footpads during the later months of hibernation, and bits of this dried callused skin has been found in fecal plug material.

Fecal plugs are expelled by the bear upon waking in spring, usually near the entrance to the den.

References

Feces
Digestive system